Lajos Kossuth Elementary School is an educational institute with eight grades located in Nyékládháza, Hungary. The principal is Miklós (Michael) Marján.

History
The school was founded by the local government of Nyékládháza City in 1978.

Location
 Hungary
 Nyékládháza, 
 Kossuth street 54/b

Educational activity
In 2011 the number of indentured students was 435. There are 19 classes, 9 lower schools and 10 upper schools.
 Talent care
Within schedule: foreign language groups in English and German from 3rdh grade to 8th grade and high level mathematics from 4th grade
Freetime programs: preparatory classes in Hungarian Literature and in Mathematics for the 8th graders
 Art courses with the help of art schools
Ede Reményi Elementary Musical Institute
Six instruments: piano, guitar, tuba, flute, and trumpet
Karakter Elementary Art Institute
Standard dance and Hungarian folk dance
 ISK special classes: talent care and ensuring the daily exercise of the students
Sports: football, handball, karate, table tennis, and archery

References

Nyékládháza, official website, Instituts, October 9,2011 in Hungarian 
Nyékládháza, official site, official documents, October 9,2011 in Hungarian

Education in Borsod-Abaúj-Zemplén County
Educational institutions established in 1978
Schools in Hungary
Buildings and structures in Borsod-Abaúj-Zemplén County
1978 establishments in Hungary